Marian Shinn is a South African politician, a former Member of Parliament with the Democratic Alliance (DA), and the  former Shadow Minister of Telecommunications and Postal Services.

Early life and journalism career
Shinn was born and educated in Zimbabwe.

She moved to South Africa in 1971 to join the Rand Daily Mail.
Her journalism career continued at The Star in 1974 where Shinn focused on human rights and social welfare issues. She was on the team that reported from Alexandra, north of Johannesburg, during the June 1976 student uprising.

During her journalism career, she also worked for the Sunday Tribune, Sunday Times and Sunday Express, before venturing into Information Technology (IT) trade journalism.

In 1984, Shinn won the first IT Journalism of the Year award for editing South Africa's first magazine aimed at business users of IT and the following year, she started a public relations consultancy specialising in IT.

Political career
Marian was active in the Five Freedoms Forum that aimed to promote dialogue between white and black South Africans, and in 1989 she was part of the forum's delegation that visited the African National Congress in Lusaka.

On moving to Cape Town in 1998, Shinn joined the Muizenberg branch of the Democratic Party and frequently served as the branch chairperson, actively driving growth and diversity in Ward 64. 
She is also a member of the South Peninsula constituency.

Other interests and hobbies
Other pursuits have included being active in environmental groups such as the Friend of the Pilanesberg and Zandvlei Trust.

Shinn is also a writer; in 2002, her feature film script was a selected as a finalist at the Moondance Film Festival held in Boulder, Colorado.

Political life
Shinn served as the DA Shadow Minister of Telecommunications and Postal Services. In this position she has raised many questions about the ruling party in South Africa and problems within her realm of expertise.

Shinn retired from politics at the 2019 general election.

References 

Living people
Democratic Alliance (South Africa) politicians
Members of the National Assembly of South Africa
21st-century South African women politicians
21st-century South African politicians
Year of birth missing (living people)